By-elections were held in Thailand on 11 January 2009. The elections were held to fill 26 vacant parliamentary seats. elected by the first past the post voting system.

Results

North-East

Nakhon Panom Constituency 1 by-election

Udontani Constituency 2 by-election

Ubolratchatani Constituency 2 by-election

Ubolratchatani Constituency 3 by-election

Buri Lam Constituency 2 by-election

Buri Lam Constituency 4 by-election

Mahasarakam Constituency 1 by-election

Roi Et Constituency 1 by-election

Srisaket Constituency 1 by-election

Srisaket Constituency 2 by-election

North

Lampang Constituency 1 by-election

Lampun Constituency 1 by-election

ฺCentral

Bangkok Constituency 10 by-election

Pathumtani Constituency 10 by-election

Chachoengsao Constituency 1 by-election

Nakhon Pathom Constituency 1 by-election

Samut Prakan Constituency 1 by-election

Saraburi Constituency 2 by-election

Singburi Constituency 1 by-election

Ratchaburi Constituency 1 by-election

Lopburi Constituency 1 by-election

Suphanburi Constituency 1 by-election

Suphanburi Constituency 2 by-election

Angthong Constituency 1 by-election

Uthaitani Constituency 1 by-election

South

Narathiwat Constituency 2 by-election

References 

2009
Elections